Her Strange Wedding is a lost 1917 American drama silent film directed by George Melford and written by Charles Maigne and George Middleton. The film stars Fannie Ward, Jack Dean, Tom Forman and William Elmer. The film was released on June 25, 1917, by Paramount Pictures.

Plot

Cast
Fannie Ward as Coralie Grayson
Jack Dean as Dr. Max Brownell
Tom Forman as Lee Brownell
William Elmer as Peter

References

External links

1910s English-language films
Silent American drama films
1917 drama films
Paramount Pictures films
Films directed by George Melford
American black-and-white films
Lost American films
American silent feature films
1917 lost films
Lost drama films
1910s American films